Lachmann's law is a somewhat disputed phonological sound law for Latin named after German Indo-Europeanist Karl Lachmann who first formulated it sometime in the middle of the 19th century. According to it, vowels in Latin lengthen before Proto-Indo-European voiced stops which are followed by another (unvoiced) stop.

Compare:
 PIE * 'led' >  (cf. short vowel in Ancient Greek )
 PIE * 'fortified' >  (cf. short vowel in Sanskrit )
 PIE * 'covered' >  (cf. short vowel in Ancient Greek )

According to  Lachmann's law is an example of a sound law that affects deep phonological structure, not the surface result of phonological rules. In Proto-Indo-European, a voiced stop was already pronounced as voiceless before voiceless stops, as the assimilation by voicedness must have been operational in PIE ( →  'forced, made'). Lachmann's law, however, did not act upon the result of the assimilation, but on the deep structure  >  > . Indo-Europeanists reject this explanation, generally believing that the voiced finals were analogically restored in the appropriate forms before being deleted again.

For example,  defends the Neogrammarian analysis of Lachmann's law as analogy followed by sound change (* ⇒ * > * > ). Although this formulation ultimately derives from de Saussure (1885: 256), Jasanoff's formulation also explains problems such as:
 > * >  
- ⇒ *- >  
 > * ⇒ * > * > 

The law also does not operate before PIE voiced aspirate stops. Based on this, the glottalic theory reinterprets the law not to reflect lengthening before voiced stops, but before glottalized stops. In that case the assumption that we are dealing with an example of a sound law that affects deep phonological structure is not required.

See also
 Winter's law, a similar law operating in Balto-Slavic

References
 
 . PhD dissertation.
 

Sound laws